The Straight Story is a 1999 biographical road drama film directed by David Lynch. It was edited and produced by Mary Sweeney, Lynch's longtime partner and collaborator, who also co-wrote the script with John E. Roach. It is based on the true story of Alvin Straight's 1994 journey across Iowa and Wisconsin on a lawn mower. Alvin is an elderly World War II veteran who lives with his kind intellectually disabled daughter. When he hears that his estranged brother has suffered a stroke, Alvin makes up his mind to visit him and hopefully make amends before he dies.

The Straight Story was released by Buena Vista Pictures (under the Walt Disney Pictures banner) in the United States, and was a critical success, though it underperformed at the box office. Reviewers praised the intensity of the character performances, particularly the realistic dialogue which film critic Roger Ebert compared to the works of Ernest Hemingway. It received a nomination for the Palme d'Or at the 1999 Cannes Film Festival and Farnsworth received a nomination for the Academy Award for Best Actor.

Plot
In Laurens, Iowa, Alvin Straight fails to show up to his regular bar meeting with friends and is eventually found lying on his kitchen floor. His daughter, Rose, takes her reluctant father to see a doctor, who sternly admonishes Alvin to give up tobacco and use a walking frame. Alvin refuses and instead opts to use two canes. Shortly after, Alvin learns that his brother, Lyle, has suffered a stroke. Longing to visit him, but unable to drive, Alvin develops a plan to travel 240 miles to Mount Zion, Wisconsin on his riding lawnmower, towing a small homemade travel-trailer along the way. This stirs doubt and worry in the minds of his family, friends, and neighbors.

Alvin's first attempt fails: after experiencing difficulty starting the old mower's motor, he does not get far before the machine breaks down. Alvin arranges for his mower to be transported back home on a flatbed truck, where he takes out his frustrations on the mower with a shotgun blast. At the John Deere dealership, he purchases a used lawn tractor whose transmission is still intact from 1966. The salesman offers Alvin kind words as his journey resumes.

On the side of the highway, Alvin passes a young female hitchhiker who later approaches his campfire and says that she could not get a ride. In conversation, Alvin deduces that she is pregnant and has run away from home. Alvin tells her about the importance of family by describing a bundle of sticks that is hard to break compared to a single stick. The next day, Alvin emerges from the trailer to find that she has left him a bundle of sticks tied together. Later, a huge group of RAGBRAI cyclists race past him. He arrives at the cyclists' camp and is greeted with applause. That night, he speaks with a pair of friendly cyclists around the campfire about growing old.

The next day, Alvin is troubled by massive trucks passing him. He then interacts with a distraught woman who has hit a deer and is being driven insane by the fact she continually hits deer while commuting, no matter how hard she tries to avoid them. She drives away in a tearful huff, and Alvin, who has started to run short on food, cooks and eats the deer. He mounts the antlers on his trailer as a tribute to the deer and the sustenance it provided. Alvin's brakes fail as he travels down a steep hill; he struggles to maintain control of the speeding tractor and finally manages to bring the vehicle to a complete stop. A man named Danny helps Alvin get his mower and trailer off the main road. They discover that the mower has transmission problems.

Now beginning to run low on cash, Alvin borrows a cordless phone from Danny – gently refusing an invitation to come indoors – and calls Rose to ask her to send him his Social Security check. He leaves money on the doorstep to pay for his telephone call. Danny offers Alvin a ride the rest of the way to Lyle's, but Alvin declines, stating that he prefers to travel his own way. Verlyn, an elderly war veteran, takes Alvin into town for a drink. As Alvin does not drink alcohol, he orders a glass of milk, and the two men exchange traumatic stories about their experiences in World War II fighting against the Germans.

Alvin's tractor is fixed, and he is presented with an exorbitant bill by the mechanics, who are twins and are constantly bickering. Alvin successfully negotiates the price down and explains his mission to help his brother. The twins seem to relate to Alvin's struggle. Alvin crosses the Mississippi River and makes camp in a cemetery. He chats with a Catholic priest who recognizes Lyle's name and is aware of his stroke. The priest says that Lyle did not mention he had a brother. Alvin responds that all he wants is to make peace with Lyle after their falling out ten years prior.

Finally arriving in Mount Zion, Alvin stops at a bar to have a single beer: his first drink in years. He asks the bartender for directions to Lyle's house. Alvin experiences engine trouble just a few miles from Lyle's house and stops in the middle of the road. A large farm tractor driving by stops to help, then leads the way to make sure Alvin gets to his destination. When he arrives, Alvin finds the house dilapidated. He calls for his brother, who appears using a walking frame. Using two canes, Alvin makes his way to the door. Lyle invites Alvin to sit down on the porch. Lyle tearfully looks at Alvin's mower-tractor contraption and asks if Alvin had ridden it just to see him. Alvin simply responds, "I did, Lyle." The two men sit together silently and gaze up at the stars.

Cast

Production

Development 
In 1994, 73-year-old Alvin Straight rode a lawnmower across 300 miles of the American Midwest to visit his ailing brother. Mary Sweeney, David Lynch's frequent collaborator, read about Straight's story in The New York Times that summer. Said Sweeney, "Growing up in Wisconsin, I easily connected with that kind of stoic, non-verbal, stubborn, idiosyncratic American character. I get how hard it is to have quiet pride and dignity when you're old and poor and are living in the middle of nowhere. I understand what these people's dreams and frustrations are. And I loved how much his journey captured the national imagination, so, wearing my producer's hat, I started trying to secure the rights." 

Producer Ray Stark had already acquired the rights to Straight's story and envisioned the project as a potential star vehicle for Paul Newman. Straight died in 1996, and the rights to his story became available again. Sweeney co-wrote the script with John Roach, a childhood friend; the two retraced Straight's route in the process of writing. When Lynch saw the finished script he immediately took to it, saying "it became, for me, very real."

Casting 
For the role of Alvin Straight, producers cast their first choice, Richard Farnsworth. Though he was reluctant to commit to the role as he was then terminally ill with metastatic prostate cancer, he took the role out of admiration for Straight. Sissy Spacek, a longtime friend of Lynch's who had helped to finance his earlier film Eraserhead, was cast as Alvin's daughter, Rose. Harry Dean Stanton was cast as Alvin's ailing brother.

Filming 
The Straight Story was independently shot along the actual route taken by Straight, and all scenes were shot in chronological order in the autumn of 1998. Lynch would later call the film "my most experimental movie".

During production, Farnsworth's cancer had spread to his bones, but he astonished his co-workers with his tenacity during production. The paralysis of his legs as shown in the film was real. Farnsworth died by suicide the following year, at the age of 80.

The Straight Story was acquired by Walt Disney Pictures in the United States after a successful debut at Cannes and was given a G-rating by the MPAA (the only Lynch film to receive such a rating).

Music

The musical score for The Straight Story was composed by Angelo Badalamenti, continuing a 13-plus year collaboration with Lynch that began with Blue Velvet. A soundtrack album was released on October 12, 1999, by Windham Hill Records.

Soundtrack
All music composed and conducted by Angelo Badalamenti.

Critical reception 
The Straight Story was critically acclaimed upon its release, with critics lauding Lynch's uncharacteristic subject matter. Entertainment Weekly described the film as a "celestial piece of Americana". The Chicago Tribune wrote of the film, "we see something American studio movies usually don't give us: the simple, unsentimentalized beauty of the rural American Midwestern landscape." 

Janet Maslin of The New York Times wrote, "the same bellwether quality that left Blue Velvet looking so prescient, and ushered in a whole cinematic wave of taboo-shattering, is at work once again. When a born unnaturalist like Lynch can bring such interest and emotion to one man's simple story, the realm of the ordinary starts looking like a new frontier." Of Farnsworth's performance, Maslin wrote, "he automatically frees the film from any sense of artifice and delivers an amazingly stalwart performance that will not soon be forgotten." Her review concluded, "The Straight Story is...about gazing at the sky, about experiencing each encounter to the fullest, than it is about getting anywhere in a hurry. It's been too long since a great American movie dared to regard life that way."

Roger Ebert gave the film four out of four stars, the first positive review he had ever given for a film by Lynch. He wrote, "The movie isn't just about the old Alvin Straight's odyssey through the sleepy towns and rural districts of the Midwest, but about the people he finds to listen and care for him."

On review aggregator Rotten Tomatoes, the film has an approval rating of 95% based on 106 reviews, with an average rating of 8.2/10. The website's critical consensus reads, "With strong performances and director David Lynch at the helm, The Straight Story steers past sentimental byways on its ambling journey across the American heartland." On Metacritic, the film has a score of 86 out of 100, based on 32 critics, indicating "universal acclaim". AllMovie wrote, "David Lynch offers an uncharacteristically straightforward and warmly sentimental approach to his material in this film", calling it "one of his best films".

Home media
The Straight Story was released on DVD on November 7, 2000. As with many of Lynch's films, there are no chapter markers on the original North American DVD release, with a note written by Lynch inside the DVD case that reads, "It is my opinion that a film is not a book - it should not be broken up. It is a continuum and should be seen as such." 

On September 17, 2021, The Straight Story received a limited edition Blu-ray release from Imprint Films.

Awards and honors
The Straight Story was nominated for the Palme d'Or at the 1999 Cannes Film Festival. Richard Farnsworth earned an Academy Award nomination for Best Actor for his portrayal of Alvin Straight. For 20 years he held the record for the oldest person (at 79) to be nominated for a Best Actor Oscar until 2021 when Anthony Hopkins was nominated at age 83. Farnsworth also won the 1999 New York Film Critics Circle Award for Best Actor for his performance in the film.

Notes

References

External links
 – archived from the original on September 20, 2020

1999 films
1990s biographical drama films
1990s drama road movies
American biographical drama films
American drama road movies
British biographical drama films
British drama road movies
French biographical drama films
English-language French films
1990s English-language films
Films about atonement
Films about old age
Films directed by David Lynch
Films set in Iowa
Films set in Wisconsin
Films shot in Iowa
Films shot in Wisconsin
American independent films
1999 independent films
Film4 Productions films
StudioCanal films
Walt Disney Pictures films
Films scored by Angelo Badalamenti
John Deere
European Film Awards winners (films)
French drama road movies
American films based on actual events
1999 drama films
Films about brothers
Films about father–daughter relationships
1990s American films
1990s British films
1990s French films